Urazbayevo (Uraźbay) is a rural locality (a village) in Itkulovsky Selsoviet, Ishimbaysky District, Bashkortostan, Russia. The population was 638 as of 2010. There are 7 streets.

Geography 
Urazbayevo is located 31 km southeast of Ishimbay (the district's administrative centre) by road. Verkhneitkulovo is the nearest rural locality.

References 

Rural localities in Ishimbaysky District